Miroslav Beblavý (born 6 January 1977 in Bratislava, Czechoslovakia) is a Slovak former politician, economist and businessman. Between 2010 and 2020, he served three terms as an MP of the National Council of Slovakia. In addition he held the post of State Secretary at the  Ministry of Labor, Social Affairs and Family. He was also the chairman of the Together – Civic Democracy party in the 2018-2020 period, co-leading the unsuccessful election coalition with Progressive Slovakia in the 2020 Slovak parliamentary election. Previously, he was the Deputy Chairman of the Sieť party.

Early life
Miroslav Beblavý studied finance at the University of Economics in Bratislava and Theatre Directing at the Academy of Performing Arts in Bratislava. He received his PhD in economics from the University of St Andrews in 2005.

As a student, Beblavý was already active in policy debates, covering economic development for the SME newspaper and an analyst for the Institute for Economic and Social Reforms, a think tank. During his PhD studies, he managed another think tank - the Slovak Governance Institute. In addition, over the course of the 2010s, Beblavý was active in various consultancy projects  for the World Bank, OECD and the European Commission supporting economic reforms in developing countries.

In 2002 Beblavý co-founded the Institute of Public Policy at the Comenius University in Bratislava. He taught at the Institute until the mid-2010s. Between 2010 and 2019 he was a Senior Fellow and a Head of Unit at the Centre for European Policy Studies think tank in Brussels.

Political career

State secretary
Beblavý's first foray in the politics came very early in his life. In 2002 at the age of 25 he became State Secretary at he Labor ministry under ministers Ľudovít Kaník and Iveta Radičová. As a State Secretary he helped to introduce free school meals for needy children and a reform of welfare entitlements.

Member of Parliament

SDKÚ period
Beblavý became a member of the Slovak Democratic and Christian Union – Democratic Party (SDKÚ) in 2009 and got elected MP on the party list in the 2010 Slovak parliamentary election. As an MP, he managed to implement several partial reforms such as mandatory online publication of final theses at the Slovak universities and more transparency in allocation of European funding.

In the 2012 Slovak parliamentary election Beblavý again ran on the list of SDKÚ, which was at the time heavily implicated in the corruption allegations known as the Gorilla scandal. Beblavý was not personally involved in the scandal, however the party ended up performing poorly in the election losing 17 out of its previously held 28 parliamentary seats. Nonetheless, Beblavý managed to preserve his seat due to receiving over 15,000 personal votes under Slovakia's optional preferential voting system.

With regards to the Gorilla scandal Beblavý at first supported the party leadership, while insisting on a thorough investigations of the allegations. However, in 2013 he joined the group of rebel MPs led by Lucia Žitňanská who left the party over its associations with disreputable characters.

Sieť and Spolu period
In 2014, Beblavý joined the newly established Sieť party founded by a fellow MPs Radoslav Procházka a defector from the Christian Democratic Movement and Andrej Hrnčiar who was originally elected on the Most–Híd party list. Beblavý got elected deputy chairman of the new party but unlike the Procházka and Hrnčiar, he did not give up his mandate and remained MP for the rest of the term. As the sole Sieť MP, Beblavý managed to get legislation approved to greatly liberalize the mortgage market in Slovakia, resulting in a rapid decline in mortgage interest rates and - according to the some claims - fueling growth of household debt and real estate prices.  He also raised awareness about many cases of corruption and irregularities in the public sector.

In the 2016 Slovak parliamentary elections, Sieť severely underperformed the polls and with 5.6% of votes barely passed the 5% representation threshold. Beblavý himself, however, retained his seat. Soon after the election, Procházka agreed to join the coalition with the Direction – Slovak Social Democracy in spite of promises made before the election. Beblavý considered this alliance a betrayal of the voters and left the party along with two other Sieť MPs - Simona Petrík and Viera Dubačová.

Over the course of 2017 and 2018 Beblavý and two other two Sieť rebels teamed up with defector MPs from other parties - Jozef Mihál from the Freedom and Solidarity party and Oto Žarnay from Ordinary People and Independent Personalities to start a new party called Together – Civic Democracy (Spolu). Beblavý became the chairman of the new party. While leading Spolu, Beblavý remained an active MP, notably leading an initiative to stop import tax fraud scheme, which led to the registration of the high-profile head of Slovak Financial Administration authority František Imrecze.

Spolu formed an electoral coalition with another newly formed party, Progressive Slovakia. The coalition appeared to have a momentum at first, winning the 2019 European Parliament election with over 20% of the vote. Nonetheless, in underperformed polls in the 2020 Slovak parliamentary election, gaining 6.96% of the vote, just a few hundred votes short of the 7% representation threshold for election coalitions. The party consequently lost all its MP seats, including Beblavý's. Soon after the election, Beblavý, who co-led the list with Progressive Slovakia leader Michal Truban, resigned his party chairmanship and retired from politics.

Life after politics
Following the loss of his MP seat, Beblavý returned to consulting and academic career, including notably teaching at Sciences Po. He also initiated several business projects.

Personal life
Beblavý is married to Emília Sičáková-Beblavá since 2002. They have two sons.

References 

Living people
People from Bratislava
1977 births
Members of the National Council (Slovakia) 2010-2012
Members of the National Council (Slovakia) 2012-2016
Members of the National Council (Slovakia) 2016-2020
Slovak Democratic and Christian Union – Democratic Party politicians
University of Economics in Bratislava alumni
Alumni of the University of St Andrews
Academy of Performing Arts in Bratislava alumni